Addiscombe Railway Park, also known as the Addiscombe Linear Park, is a  park in Addiscombe, South London, managed by the London Borough of Croydon.

The first section of the park was opened on 26 May 2007, with the second stage opened on 15 March 2010. The bus services which serve the site of Addiscombe station are London Buses routes 289, 312 and 367 while route 197 runs closely parallel to the park. The nearest tram stop is Blackhorse Lane.

Former use
It occupies the track route and green buffering land of the demolished Addiscombe Line, a short railway that ran between Lower Addiscombe Road and Woodside Junction near Blackhorse Lane tram stop, a branch line off what was the Woodside and South Croydon Joint Railway (WSCJR). The site of Addiscombe railway station has been turned into housing. Most of the route of the WSCJR, the parent line, is part of Tramlink.

See also
List of Parks and Open Spaces in Croydon

External links
Croydon Council - Addiscombe Railway Park
Friends of Addiscombe Railway Park
History at Croydon Council website

Parks and open spaces in the London Borough of Croydon
Urban public parks
2007 establishments in England
Rail trails in England